Shen Bao, formerly transliterated as Shun Pao or Shen-pao, known in English as Shanghai News, was a newspaper published from 30 April 1872 to 27 May 1949 in Shanghai, China. The name is short for Shenjiang Xinbao, Shenjiang being a short form of Chunshen Jiang, the old name for the Huangpu River.

The influence of the newspaper in early 20th century Shanghai was such that Shen Bao zhi, literally "Shen-pao paper", became a generic term for newspaper or newsprint.<ref>蔣遵和 (Jiang Zunhe), “拿張申報紙來”是什麼意思  (What does "bring a sheet of Shen Pao paper mean"?), Shanghai Municipal Archives (re-published by EastDay).</ref>

 Formation 
Founded by Ernest Major (1841–1908), a British businessman, in 1872, Shen Bao was one of the first modern Chinese newspapers. Major's Chinese language skills had been considered “legendary” and with the investment of four other Britons, he began managing Shen Bao. He was committed to bettering China by adopting Western Institutions and running a profitable business.  (When Major returned to England in 1889, the newspaper was reorganized as Major Company Limited.)

Because Shen Bao was based and published out of the Shanghai International Settlement, it was subject to fewer regulations compared to many other Chinese newspapers. The International Settlement was governed by the Shanghai Municipal Council which was completely separate from the Qing court and foreign consulate. The freedom of press granted in the International Settlement in Shanghai was “even greater than that enjoyed by British papers in London itself”. (Wagner, 4) Because of this lack of state regulation, Shen Bao was considered a reliable and independent source of information and “had acquired the reputation of being more independent and more reliable than most of the other available sources” (Wagner, 5). Chinese officials considered foreign journalists to be “infinitely more credible, reliable and honest than their own countrymen”. (Wagner, 19) Major specifically adopted an editorial policy geared toward improving China's long-term growth and development.

To further grow the business and establish itself as  a “public forum in China” Shen Bao regularly reprinted essays from Xunhuan ribao in Hong Kong and the Jingbao announcements from the government. Furthermore, Shen Bao frequently published the essays of great reformist publicist Liang Qichao who has been “hailed as the father of modern Chinese journalism”. Although he did not invent the new newspaper style in the 1890s, he is said to have perfected it.  (Judge, 235)

Major differentiated himself from other foreign newspaper publishers in two areas. First, from the outset, he made it clear that the new newspaper would be for Chinese readers, and thus that it would emphasize news and issues of interest to Chinese, not foreigners. Secondly, he put Chinese compradors in charge of running the business and let
Chinese editors pick news items and write editorials. These two methods proved very effective. While the Chinese compradors used their knowledge of and connections with the local community to raise circulation and attract advertisements, they kept the price of the paper lower than that of its competitor. Simultaneously, Chinese editors did a better job of making Shen Bao appeal to Chinese readers' taste. Within one year, Shen Bao had put Shanghai Xinbao out of business and become the only Chinese newspaper in Shanghai until the appearance of Xin Bao in 1876 and Hu Bao in 1882.
Archibald R. Colquhoun, wrote in 1906 comparing British and Chinese presses: “In general character the Chinese press resembles that of Europe. There are leaders and leaderettes, news item, telegrams, scraps of general information and advertisement. Along the top, where we are accustomed to see the title, runs the pious exhortation to " respect the written word," and the custom of reverently collecting and burning all printed matter still survives”. (Calhoun, 101)

 Role in public opinion Shen Bao played a pivotal role in the formation of public opinion in the late 19th century. An example is its campaign in its first years against the new practice of employing young women as waitress in opium dens, which "blurred the demarcation line between acceptable and unacceptable practices by putting waitresses in the ambiguous position of implicitly providing sex services in the opium dens. Worse still, the opium dens embracing this practice were mostly located in the French Concession, connecting the issue to the presence of foreigners in Shanghai." As a result of the uproar, the practice was banned (although in practice not eradicated).Shen Bao also reflected the changing attitudes towards women as a new audience group - how the newspaper “described them in advertisements, editorials ad news reports”. Women became a group that could be considered: adverts were directed at the feminine reading public. Newspaper was able to address women directly but also prescribed new feminine roles. This new role gave rise to the acceptance of public female schooling.

 Impact on Chinese society 
The newspaper "innovated in printing technology, the use of the telegraph, the employment of a military correspondent (sent to cover the Sino-French War in Vietnam in 1884), and the use of the vernacular (baihua)"; it quickly established a reputation as one of the best in China, coming under Chinese ownership in 1909, and by the early 20th century was printing 30,000 copies a day, 9,000 circulated in Shanghai and the rest elsewhere in China. "By the early 1920s its circulation was 50,000; by the end of the decade 100,000; and by the mid 1930s, 150,000." Shen Bao was also notably a part of the commercialization of the Chinese press in the 1930s that prioritized advertising and mass circulation. (MacKinnon, 9) The paper's offices were in the International Settlement, "about a block away from the Central Police Station." In its early period, it had eight pages, with news, essays, and advertisements as well as imperial decrees and memorials. "Because the editorial policies followed the principle of 'reporting whatever possible and letting the readers determine the truth,' many interesting but unfounded rumors were often included as news." After 1905, it increased its size to 20 pages.Shen Bao also became a conduit between the high and low society, connecting the two in a way that was largely unprecedented. The court was the loudest and most continuous voice in the public sphere and continued to be with the publication of newspapers. The court had a specific section called guanbao which were a print form of Jingbao, a government approved set of public communications posted on boards in front of the government. Guanbao became the preferred method of communication and increased communication between high and low. (Wagner, 11)

Additionally, Shen Bao allowed “those below” to speak out about their opinions and criticism anonymously or in person. The publication of Jingbao gave a platform for public discussion of important issues between classes. Shen Bao published multiple editorials from opposite ends of the spectrum - sometimes even within the same issue. (Wagner, 19)

 Political affiliation and effects Shen Bao was founded as a commercial newspaper, and politically it remained conservative for its first three decades, supporting the Qing government. In 1905 it began to change its orientation, quoting Liang Qichao's constitutionalist slogans on New Year's Day; in 1907 it was sold to Xi Zipei (1867–1929), its former comprador, who "owned Shanghai's best-capitalized publishing operation, Zhongguo tushu gongsi (Chinese Library Company)" and was under the influence of Zhang Jian, and it became a moderately liberal newspaper that strongly supported the constitutional movement. "It had the following sections: editorials, international news, domestical news, local news, industry and trade, law and society, sports and education, literature and art, and advertisements. In addition to reporting important political news stories, it had many special columns and supplements such as ziyou tan (free discussion), automobile, education and life." In 1912 control was transferred to Shi Liangcai. "In the 1930s, Shi was a strong supporter of the Human Rights Defence Alliance established by Madam Soong Qing Ling, the second wife of revolutionary leader Dr Sun Yat-sen, with Cai Yuanpei and Lu Xun."

There is some scholarly debate of the role of Shen Bao in igniting revolutionary and nationalist sentiments; however, it is generally regarded that “newspapers at most echoed, rather than produced, revolutionary or national feelings. Instead of making revolutions, it was made by them” (Judge 247). “[The press] was not merely a record of what happened but and ingredient in the happening”.

 End of publication 
Due to the surveillance from Chiang Kai-Shek on the press, Shen Bao and other newspapers were frequently censored using postal bans for one day when they criticized government policy too strongly. Most of the time this was an effective enough deterrent, however, in July 1932, a warning was sent that the postal ban would not be lifted until Shen Bao fulfilled the following government requests: First, stop publishing editorials about the government's “bandit suppression” campaigns,  dismiss three of the most critical editorial writers, and allow the government to appoint a new member to the editorial staff. (Mackinnon, 16). Shen Bao fulfilled all but the latter request.

In 1934, the newspaper "incurred the government's anger because of its strong anti-Japanese attitude. On November 13, Shih Liang-ts'ai, its owner and editor-in-chief, was mysteriously assassinated on the Shanghai-Hangchow Highway"; responsibility for his murder has been attributed to the Bureau of Investigation and Statistics, Chiang Kai-shek's much-feared secret police.Frederic E. Wakeman, Spymaster: Dai Li and the Chinese Secret Service (University of California Press,), pp. 179ff. In 1938, with the city under Japanese control, Norwood Allman (1893–1987), an American lawyer who had been U.S. Consul in Shanghai in the early 1920s, was asked by the paper's Chinese owners to take over as editor; Time wrote in 1940: "A fluent Chinese linguist, Allman reads every story that goes into Shun Pao, writes editorials, corrects editorials written by staff members. He serves without pay." The paper was on bad terms with the Japanese, and in 1940 a Chinese assistant editor was killed and his head left on the street as a warning to journalists.

After the murder of Shih Liang-ts’ai, the paper lost circulation and became less radical in its criticism of the Kuomintang. (MacKinnon, 11) Allman had control over the paper until December 1941 when it was seized by the Japanese on the ground that it was an American company. Allman had incorporated it as an American company purposefully to limit his financial liability. (Chin, 5). The Japanese appointed Chen Binhe, a former Shen bao editor-in-chief who gained the trust of the Japanese, as the new president of Shen bao. (Chin, 6) “As a result, [of these new appointments] Shen bao became a mouthpiece and propaganda tool for mobilizing the Chinese masses politically, economically, and culturally for total war” (Chin, 9).

During World War II the paper passed into the hands of collaborators with the Japanese occupation, but after the war Pan Gongzhan, an influential Kuomintang party official who had been an editor on the paper in the late 1920s, became its publisher and Chen Shunyü its chief editor. In May 1949, when the People's Liberation Army took Shanghai, the newspaper was shut down.

There is a complete collection of the paper's issues in the Shanghai Library.

Literary magazine
Ernest Major's brother Frederick founded a literary magazine Yinghuan suoji (瀛寰瑣記; "Random Sketches of the World"), published by the Shen Bao since November 1872. The magazine printed fiction, essays and poetry.

See also

History of newspapers and magazines#China
 North China Daily News Shanghai Evening Post and Mercury Der Ostasiatischer Lloyd Shanghai Jewish Chronicle Deutsche Shanghai Zeitung Shanghai's Lens on the News (text and translations) on MIT Visualizing Cultures website
 Catherine Vance Yeh, "Recasting the Chinese Novel: Ernest Major's Shenbao Publishing House (1872-1890)", Transcultural Studies'' 2015.1, pp. 171–289.

References

External links
ICON (International Coalition on Newspapers) listing

Publications established in 1872
Newspapers published in Shanghai
1872 establishments in China
Publications disestablished in 1949
1949 disestablishments in China
Defunct newspapers published in China